Prince of Hailing may refer to:
Xiao Zhaowen, demoted emperor of the Southern Qi dynasty
Wanyan Liang, demoted emperor of the Jurchen Jin dynasty